HD 70514, also known as HR 3280, is a solitary, orange hued star located in the southern circumpolar constellation Volans, the flying fish. It has an apparent magnitude of 5.06, making it one of the brighter members of this generally faint constellation. Based on parallax measurements from the Gaia spacecraft,  the star is estimated to be 298 light years distant. Eggen (1994) lists it as a member of the thin disk population.

HD 70514 is classified as a red giant, having a stellar classification of K1 III. It is currently on the red giant branch, fusing a hydrogen shell around an inert helium. Based on asteroseismologic measurements, HD 70514 has a mass 1.88 times that of the Sun. HR 3280 is metal enriched, having a metallicity 66% above solar levels.

References 

Volans (constellation)
3280
70514
040680
K-type giants
PD-65 00907